Mount Leech is a peak of the Walker Mountains, standing  northwest of Mount Hubbard in Thurston Island, Antarctica. It was delineated from air photos taken by U.S. Navy Operation Highjump in December 1946, and was named by the Advisory Committee on Antarctic Names for entomologist Robert E. Leech, who participated in a United States Antarctic Research Program airborne insect program in the Ross, Amundsen and Bellingshausen Sea areas in the 1959–60 season.

See also
 Mountains in Antarctica

Maps
 Thurston Island – Jones Mountains. 1:500000 Antarctica Sketch Map. US Geological Survey, 1967.
 Antarctic Digital Database (ADD). Scale 1:250000 topographic map of Antarctica. Scientific Committee on Antarctic Research (SCAR). Since 1993, regularly upgraded and updated.

References

Mountains of Ellsworth Land